Nils-Kristian "Kris" Nissen (born 20 July 1960 in Arnum) is a retired Danish auto racing driver. For several years he was Volkswagen's motorsport director. Since the summer of 2013 he has had a career change and is currently owner and temporary manager of a Danish campingsite called Enderupskov in Southern Jutland.

Single seater and sports car racing
Nissen started racing in karting, and was twice Danish Champion in 1976 and 1977. He was Danish Formula Ford 2000 Champion in 1982 and German Formula Three Champion in 1986. in 1987 and 1988 he drove in Japan with a Porsche 962 in the All Japan Sports Prototype Championship. During his time there he was involved in an accident at Fuji in 1988 in which he suffered serious burns to his body and face. He was removed from the wrecked car by fellow driver Paolo Barilla and he spent two weeks in a coma.

Touring car racing

Between 1989 and 1992 he drove in the DTM for various teams in a works supported BMW M3. In 1991 he won the 24 Hours of Nürburgring with the Schnitzer Motorsport BMW. In 1992 he won the Nordic Touring Car Cup and for the second half of the year he replaced the injured Alain Menu in the British Touring Car Championship for BMW. He finished as runner-up in the 1993 ADAC GT Cup, followed by a return to the DTM in 1994 in a privateer Alfa Romeo. In this year he won his only DTM race.

He continued to race in Germany, when he competed in the German STW Super Touring Cup with a Ford Mondeo in 1995, and Audi A4 in 1996, 1997 and 1999. He spent a brief time in the 1999 inaugural Danish Touring Car Championship in a Volkswagen Beetle. In 2000 he returned once more to the resurrected DTM, with the Abt Sportsline-run Audi TT. For his final two years in racing he competed in the V8Star Series in 2001 and 2002.

Racing record

Complete International Formula 3000 results
(key) (Races in bold indicate pole position; races in italics indicate fastest lap.)

Complete 24 Hours of Le Mans results

Complete Deutsche Tourenwagen Meisterschaft/Masters results
(key) (Races in bold indicate pole position) (Races in italics indicate fastest lap)

† — Retired, but was classified as he completed 90% of the winner's race distance.

Complete British Touring Car Championship results
(key) (Races in bold indicate pole position) (Races in italics indicate fastest lap)

Complete Super Tourenwagen Cup results
(key) (Races in bold indicate pole position) (Races in italics indicate fastest lap)

References

External links
 BTCC Pages Profile.
 Profile at Driver Database.

1960 births
Living people
British Touring Car Championship drivers
Danish racing drivers
Danish Touring Car Championship drivers
German Formula Three Championship drivers
British Formula 3000 Championship drivers
Deutsche Tourenwagen Masters drivers
World Sportscar Championship drivers
BMW M drivers
Abt Sportsline drivers
Team Joest drivers
Schnitzer Motorsport drivers
Nürburgring 24 Hours drivers